Trevillet or Trevillett is a hamlet in Cornwall, England, United Kingdom. It is located within the civil parish of Tintagel, to the east of Bossiney village.

Trevillet was the site of a mansion built in the 16th century by Thomas Wood of Lew Trenchard in Devon. His son John became member of Parliament for the borough of Bossiney in the parliaments of 1614 and 1621–22 and died in 1623. The Trevillet slate quarry is nearby. In Rocky Valley (the valley of the Trevillet River) are two mills; Trevillet Mill is now a private residence and was made famous by an 1851 painting by Thomas Creswick.

Aelnat's cross, which was found at Trevillet and then moved to Trevena, is finely carved. The inscription can be read as Aelnat fecit hanc crucem pro anima sua (Ælnat made this cross for [the good of] his soul) (the back of the stone has the names of the four evangelists): the name of this man is Saxon (together with Alfwy mentioned in 1086 he is the only Anglo-Saxon recorded in connection with the area).

Trevillet Quarry was the largest slate quarry in Tintagel and at its height of activity employed 200 men. Although still open, it now employs considerably fewer. The saw house where the slate was cut up became the Maybridge Chemical Works which relocated to Loughborough in 2011 with the loss of 60 local jobs.

References

Hamlets in Cornwall
Tintagel